Pipiza femoralis is a species of syrphid fly in the family Syrphidae.

References

Further reading

External links

 Diptera.info

Pipizinae
Diptera of North America
Taxa named by Hermann Loew
Insects described in 1866